Events from the year 2006 in Romania.

Incumbents 

 President: Traian Băsescu
Prime Minister: Călin Popescu-Tăriceanu

Events

April 
 14 April – President Traian Băsescu promulgates a law meant to reform the healthcare system.

June 

July 

October 
21 October – Romanian Television (Televiziunea Română, TVR) announces the 100 Greatest Romanians vote results.

Deaths

January 

 27 January – Carol Lambrino, 86, Romanian Prince, elder son of King Carol II of Romania.

February 

 21 February – Angelica Rozeanu, 84, Romanian-born table tennis world champion, cirrhosis.

March 

 9 March – Laura Stoica, 38, Romanian pop rock singer, composer and actress.

June 

 1 June – Radu Bălescu, Romanian scientist (b. 1932)
 18 June – Gică Petrescu, 91, Romanian folk music composer and performer.

November 

 20 November – Zoia Ceaușescu, Romanian mathematician (b. 1949)

See also

2006 in Europe
Romania in the Eurovision Song Contest 2006
Romania at the 2006 Winter Olympics

References

External links 

 

 
Years of the 21st century in Romania
Romania
2000s in Romania
Romania